Before Twilight is a 2008 Polish comedy film drama directed by Jacek Bławut.

The film is about a group of old retired theatre actors in a retirement home for actors who aim to regroup and stage Goethe's Faust. The film stars a number of esteemed veteran Polish actors including Irena Kwiatkowska and Roman Kłosowski, who plays Nostradamus.

The film, produced in 2008, was featured at the 2008 Polish Feature Film Festival where it won a Silver Lion award for director Jacek Bławut and picked up several other awards. It was later released theatrically in Poland on 15 May 2009.

The Gothenburg Symphony Orchestra were invited to perform part of the soundtrack.

Cast
Nina Andrycz as herself
Maria Białkowska as Zosia
Sonia Bohosiewicz as Malgorzata
Stefan Burczyk as Sodolski
Wieńczysław Gliński as himself
Witold Gruca as himself
Lech Gwit as Henryk
Robert Jurczyga as Czarek
Fabian Kiebicz as Fred
Roman Kłosowski as Nostradamus
Ewa Krasnodębska as Marilyn
Irena Kwiatkowska as herself
Bożena Mrowińska as Renata
Jan Nowicki as Jerzy
Kazimierz Orzechowski as himself
Antoni Pawlicki as Student
Zofia Perczyńska as Matylda
Marek Sitarski as Gardener Stefan
Witold Skaruch as John
Anna Grażyna Suchocka
Danuta Szaflarska as Barbara
Teresa Szmigielówna as Teresa
Beata Tyszkiewicz as Róza
Zofia Wilczyńska as Dorota
Bohdan Wróblewski as Tyka
The idea was to gather an all-star cast of veteran actors, including those who starred in movies or stage plays as early as before World War II. Unfortunately the movie suffered from such a long pre-production phase that many of the actors already cast had passed before the shooting started, with such notable names as Leon Niemczyk, Gustaw Holoubek, Lidia Wysocka, Irena Malkiewicz, Zdzisław Mrożewski. This led to major changes in the script.

See also
 List of Polish films of the 2000s

References

External links
 
 

2008 films
2000s Polish-language films
Polish comedy films
2008 comedy films
Films about actors
Films about theatre
Cultural depictions of Nostradamus